Lauren B. Alloy (born Lauren Helene Bersh; November 22, 1953) is an American psychologist, recognized for her research on mood disorders. Along with colleagues Lyn Abramson and Gerald Metalsky, she developed the hopelessness theory of depression. With Abramson, she also developed the depressive realism hypothesis. Alloy is a professor of psychology at Temple University in Philadelphia, Pennsylvania.

Biography 
Alloy was born in Philadelphia in 1953. She earned her B.A. in Psychology in 1974 and her Ph.D. in experimental and clinical psychology in 1979, both from the University of Pennsylvania. Her graduate school mentors were psychologists Martin Seligman and Richard Solomon.

Alloy was a faculty member at Northwestern University from 1979 to 1989. She has been a professor of psychology in the Department of Psychology at Temple University since 1989. Her research focuses on cognitive, interpersonal, and biopsychosocial processes in the onset and maintenance of depression and bipolar disorder. She is the author of over 250 scholarly publications.

In the late 1970s, Alloy and her longtime collaborator Abramson demonstrated that depressed individuals held a more accurate view than their non-depressed counterparts in a test which measured illusion of control. This finding, termed "depressive realism", held true even when the depression was manipulated experimentally.

Selected awards

 2014 - Association for Behavioral and Cognitive Therapies Lifetime Achievement Award (jointly with Lyn Abramson)
2014 - Society for Research in Psychopathology Joseph Zubin Award
2009 - Association for Psychological Science James McKeen Cattell Award for Lifetime Achievement in Applied Psychological Research (jointly with Lyn Abramson)
2003 - Society for a Science of Clinical Psychology Distinguished Scientist Award (jointly with Lyn Abramson)
2002 - American Psychological Association Master Lecturer Award in Psychopathology (jointly with Lyn Abramson)
1984 - American Psychological Association Young Psychologist Award

Selected works

 Alloy, L.B., & Abramson, L.Y. (2007).  Depressive realism.  In R. Baumeister & K. Vohs (Eds.), Encyclopedia of Social Psychology (pp. 242–243).  New York: Sage Publications.
 Alloy, L. B., Kelly, K. A., Mineka, S., & Clements, C. M. (1990). Comorbidity of anxiety and depressive disorders: a helplessness-hopelessness perspective.
 Abramson, L. Y., Metalsky, G. I., & Alloy, L. B. (1989). Hopelessness depression: A theory-based subtype of depression. Psychological review, 96(2), 358.
 Alloy, L.B., & Abramson, L.Y. (1988).  Depressive realism:  Four theoretical perspectives.  In L.B. Alloy (Ed.), Cognitive processes in depression. New York:  Guilford.
 Alloy, L. B., & Tabachnik, N. (1984). Assessment of covariation by humans and animals: the joint influence of prior expectations and current situational information. Psychological review, 91(1), 112.
 Alloy, L. B., & Abramson, L. Y. (1979). Judgment of contingency in depressed and nondepressed students: Sadder but wiser?. Journal of experimental psychology: General, 108(4), 441.

References

External links
 Temple University faculty page

1953 births
American women psychologists
Bipolar disorder researchers
Living people
Temple University faculty
University of Pennsylvania School of Arts and Sciences alumni
American women academics
21st-century American women
American clinical psychologists